Street League Skateboarding (SLS) is an international skateboarding tournament series. The league features professional street skateboarders competing for the largest monetary prize in the history of skateboarding, and was founded by professional skateboarder and entrepreneur Rob Dyrdek.

Thrill One Sports and Entertainment currently owns Street League Skateboarding, with the SLS brand sitting alongside Nitro Circus, Superjacket Productions (producers of Ridiculousness, Dude Perfect Show, Deliciousness, The Explosion Show and Crashletes) and Nitro Rallycross.

Jerusalem Skateparks designs and builds the SLS courses.

History
The idea for SLS first arose when Rob Dyrdek was dissatisfied with the state of professional street skateboarding competitions. Dyrdek proceeded to develop the SLS concept to improve upon the flaws that he identified. In 2010 he was quoted saying, "It has been a dream of mine to create a professional tour that bridges the gap between true street skateboarding and contest skating, which to date has been fragmented and misguided.  Street League™ is more than just a new contest series; it will redefine the way skateboarding competitions are done."

The inaugural year of SLS featured a four-stop arena tour that began at the Jobing.com Arena in Glendale, Arizona on August 28, 2010. The other venues for the inaugural tour were the Citizens Business Bank Arena in Ontario, California on September 11, 2010,  and the Thomas & Mack Center in Las Vegas, Nevada on September 25, 2010.

The 2011 Super Crown World Champion was Sean Malto, who upset the competitive domination of Nyjah Huston for his first Street League win and the US$200,000 first place prize. Huston won the US$200,000 Champion's prize in 2012, in addition to a championship watch and ring set from Nixon Watches, and a Chevy Sonic vehicle.

In May 2013, the GoPro camera company was announced as the official camera sponsor of the 2013 SLS international tour. GoPro, which sponsors SLS contestants Ryan Sheckler and Malto, was used to feature the broadcasts of the domestic American events, including course previews and real-time impact highlights. As of May 19, 2013, Huston had won more prize money than any other skateboarder in history.

The 2013 Super Crown World Champion, Chris Cole, also earned his first career SLS win earlier in 2013 at the Street League at X Games stop in Munich, Germany. At the championship, Cole earned US$200,000 for his win, along with the custom Nixon championship watch and ring. Huston and Luan Oliveira placed second and third respectively. Paul Rodriguez won his second SLS stop in Portland, Oregon in July 2013.

In March 2014, SLS signed a broadcasting deal with Fox Sports 1.

In 2018, SLS announced a partnership with World Skate, under which it became the body's official world tour series and world championship through 2020. The SLS World Tour also became the main qualifying path for skateboarding at the 2020 Summer Olympics. The move was criticized by Tim McFerran, president of the World Skateboarding Grand Prix (who had been attempting to negotiate his own body, the World Skateboarding Federation, as the sanctioning body for Olympic skateboarding), citing the invitational nature of the events, and concerns that they would hold a near-monopoly over professional skateboarding and the athletes who compete at the Olympics. 

In May 2019, it was announced that skateboarding would be dropped from the 2019 Pan American Games, with Panam Sports citing SLS and World Skate's decision to schedule a World Tour event in direct conflict with the Games schedule, and not have the Pan American Games be a qualifying event for the Olympics. Panam Sports argued that these decisions diminished the quality of the field, and showed a "lack of respect" on behalf of the entities.

Overview

The SLS contestants accumulate points at each pre-championship stop and only the top eight ranking contestants compete in the championship event. Each event's final features eight finalists in 90-minute heats.

The SLS prize purse is the largest in the history of competitive professional skateboarding, and was worth US$1.6 million in 2011.

SLSF and SLSCSP
In 2013, the Street League Skateboarding Foundation (SLSF) was established with the goal of increasing global participation in skateboarding. The Foundation assists municipalities and non-profits with the design, development, and construction of legal Skate Plazas, as well as assisting with the creation of community and educational programs that promote skateboarding.

An extension of SLS, "Street League Skateboarding Certified Skate Parks" (SLSCSP) built three plazas in 2013. The plazas will eventually become the locations for SLS amateur and televised qualifier contests. Locations include Erie, Colorado; the Kennesaw Skatepark in Kennesaw, Georgia; and Lake Havasu City, Arizona.

SLS World Tours

2021 SLS World tour

Street league Skateboarding Super Crown, Men's: Jacksonville, FL, USA
November 13-14, 2021.

Street league Skateboarding Super Crown, Women's : Jacksonville, FL, USA
November 13-14, 2021.

Street league Skateboarding, Men's: Lake Havasu, AZ, USA
October 29-30 2021.

Street league Skateboarding, women's: Lake Havasu, AZ, USA
October 29-30 2021.

Street League World Tour, Women's: Salt Lake City, USA. 
August 28 2021.

Street League World Tour, Men's: Salt Lake City, USA.
August 28, 2021

Street league unsanctioned 2
April 26 2021.

2020 SLS World Tour

Street league unsanctioned
December 28 2020.

2019 SLS World Tour

Street league world championships, Men's: Sao Paulo, Brazil 
September 19-22 2019.

Street league world championships, Women's: Sao Paulo, Brazil 
September 19-22 2019.

World Skate Street league Pro tour, Men's: Los Angeles, USA 
July 24-29 2019.

World skate Street league pro tour, Women's: Los Angeles, USA 
July 24-29 2019.

Street league World skate, Men's: London, UK 
May 25-26 2019.

Street league World Skate, Women's: London, UK 
May 25-26 2019.

Street league World Championships, Men's: Rio de Janeiro, Brazil 
January 10-12 2019.

Street league World Championships, Women's: Rio de Janeiro, Brazil 
January 10-12 2019.

2018 SLS World Tour

Street league pro open, Men's: Huntington beach, USA 
December 16 2018.

Street league pro open, Men's: Los Angeles, USA 
July 7 2018.

Street league pro open, Men's: London, UK 
May 26-28 2018.

Street league pro open, Women's: London, UK 
May 27 2018

2017 SLS Nike SB World Tour

SLS Nike SB Pro Open: Barcelona, Spain 
May 20–21, 2017.

SLS Nike SB World Tour Stop One: Munich, Germany 
June 24, 2017.

SLS Nike SB World Tour Stop Two: Chicago, Illinois 
August 13, 2017.

2016 SLS Nike SB World Tour

SLS Nike SB Pro Open: Barcelona, Spain 
May 21–22, 2016.

SLS Nike SB World Tour Stop One: Munich, Germany 
July 2, 2016.

SLS Nike SB World Tour Stop Two: Newark, New Jersey 
August 28, 2016.

SLS Nike SB Super Crown World Championship: Los Angeles, California 
October 2, 2016.

2015 SLS Nike SB World Tour

SLS Nike SB Pro Open: Barcelona, Spain 
May 16–17, 2015.

SLS Nike SB World Tour Stop One: Los Angeles, CA 
July 11, 2015.

SLS Nike SB World Tour Stop Two: Newark, NJ 
August 23, 2015.

SLS Nike SB Super Crown World Championship: Chicago, Illinois
October 4, 2015.

2014 SLS Nike SB World Tour

SLS Monster Energy Pro Open: Los Angeles, California
May 17–18, 2014.

SLS Nike SB World Tour Stop One: Chicago, Illinois
June 29, 2014.

SLS Nike SB World Tour Stop Two: Los Angeles, California
July 27, 2014.

SLS Nike SB Super Crown World Championship: Newark, New Jersey
August 24, 2014.

2013 SLS World Tour

SLS at X Games Foz do Iguaçu, Brazil
April 18–21, 2013.

SLS at X Games Barcelona, Spain

May 16–19, 2013.

SLS at Kansas City, Missouri

Highest Scored Trick Presented by Monster Energy: Nyjah Huston

https://web.archive.org/web/20140116101632/http://streetleague.com/archives/kc-monster-highest-scored-trick-nyjah-huston/

SLS at X Games Munich, Germany

June 27–30, 2013.

SLS at Portland, Oregon

July 14, 2013.

SLS at Los Angeles, California

August 1–4, 2013.

SLS Super Crown at New Jersey

August 25, 2013.

2013: Overall Winner, Super Crown World Champion - Chris Cole

Highest Score Trick Award, presented by Monster Energy - (9.9) Shane O'Neill, Switch Double 360 Flip

Highest Score Trick Clip http://streetleague.com/ondemand/?__mr_id=67930

2013 Street League Awards: Street League Skateboarding Awards

2012 SLS World Tour

SLS at Kansas City, Missouri

May 19, 2012.

SLS at Ontario, California

June 16, 2012.

SLS at Glendale, Arizona

July 15, 2012.

SLS at Newark, New Jersey

August 26, 2012.

2012: Overall Winner - Nyjah Huston

2011 SLS World Tour

SLS at Seattle, Washington

May 7–8, 2011. Halfonso scored 104.6 points at the first stop in Seattle, Washington.

SLS at Kansas City, Missouri

June 11–12, 2011.
The second stop in Kansas City, Missouri, was won by Huston, who scored 72.6 points for his second win of the year.

SLS at Glendale, Arizona

July 16–17, 2011.
The third stop, in Glendale, Arizona, was won by Huston, who scored 77.8 points; the victory was Huston's fourth.

SLS at Newark, New Jersey

August 28, 2011.
Malto, scoring an 81.2, became the 2011 Street League Champion by winning stop 4 of the year.

2011: Overall Winner, Super Crown World Champion - Sean Malto

2010 SLS World Tour

SLS at Glendale, Arizona

August 28, 2010.
Nyjah Huston placed first at the first ever Street League contest in Glendale, Arizona, scoring a 116.0

SLS at Ontario, California

September 11, 2010.
First place for the 2010 Ontario, California, stop was awarded to Sean Malto, who scored 120.4 points

SLS at Las Vegas, Nevada

September 25, 2010.
Shane O'Neill, scoring 146.0 points, won the final 2010 stop in Las Vegas, Nevada.

2010: Overall Winner, Super Crown World Champion - Nyjah Huston

References

Skateboarding competitions
Sports leagues established in 2010
Fox Sports 1
Professional sports leagues in the United States